Galina Baksheeva successfully defended her title, defeating Elizabeth Terry in the final, 6–4, 6–2 to win the girls' singles tennis title at the 1962 Wimbledon Championships.

Draw

Finals

Top half

Bottom half

References

External links

Girls' Singles
Wimbledon Championship by year – Girls' singles
Wimbledon Championships
Wimbledon Championships